Carolyn King was one of the first girls ever to play Little League Baseball, and was the centerpiece in a landmark battle-of-the-sexes lawsuit in 1974.

Carolyn King may also refer to:

Carolyn King (zoologist), New Zealand zoologist, professor at the University of Waikato, specialising in mammals
Carolyn Dineen King (born 1938), senior judge of the United States Court of Appeals for the Fifth Circuit 
Carolyn King Justus, American politician, a former Republican member of the North Carolina General Assembly

See also
Carol King (disambiguation)